Dmitri Dmitriyevich Naumkin (born 24 July 1976) is a Russian former competitive ice dancer. With Olga Sharutenko, he is the 1995 World Junior champion, a two-time Nebelhorn Trophy champion (1995 and 1997), the 1996 Karl Schäfer Memorial, and a two-time Winter Universiade champion (1997 and 1999).

Career 
Naumkin began skating in 1980.

Partnership with Sharutenko 
Naumkin skated in partnership with Olga Sharutenko for fifteen years, training twice daily, six days a week during their competitive career. In November 1994, the duo won gold at the 1995 World Junior Championships in Budapest, ahead of France's Stéphanie Guardia / Franck Laporte.

Sharutenko/Naumkin moved up to the senior level in the 1995–96 season, taking gold at the 1995 Nebelhorn Trophy, silver at Czech Skate, and bronze at the Lysiane Lauret Challenge. Making their Champions Series (Grand Prix) debut, they placed 7th at the 1995 NHK Trophy.

The following season, Sharutenko/Naumkin were awarded gold at the 1996 Karl Schäfer Memorial and bronze at the 1996 Skate Israel. In the absence of Oksana Grishuk / Evgeni Platov and Anjelika Krylova / Oleg Ovsiannikov, they won silver at the 1997 Russian Championships behind Irina Lobacheva / Ilia Averbukh. They concluded their season with gold at  the 1997 Winter Universiade in Jeonju, South Korea, ahead of fellow Russians Nina Ulanova / Mikhail Stifunin.

During the next two seasons, Sharutenko/Naumkin finished off the Russian national podium but won gold at the 1997 Nebelhorn Trophy and 1999 Winter Universiade. They competed together until the end of the 1998–99 season, coached by Alexei Gorshkov.

Post-competitive career 
Naumkin coaches skating in Yekaterinburg. In December 2013, he was named the president of the Figure Skating Federation of Sverdlovsk Oblast for the next four years.

Competitive highlights 
GP: Champions Series / Grand Prix

With Sharutenko

References

Navigation

Russian male ice dancers
Living people
1976 births
Sportspeople from Yekaterinburg
World Junior Figure Skating Championships medalists
Universiade medalists in figure skating
Universiade gold medalists for Russia
Competitors at the 1997 Winter Universiade
Competitors at the 1999 Winter Universiade